Glen Echo Park is an arts and cultural center in Glen Echo, Maryland, a suburb of Washington, D.C. Located about  northwest of the city's downtown area, the park's site was initially developed in 1891 as a National Chautauqua Assembly.

Following the foreclosure and sale of the Chautauqua grounds in 1903, leisure facilities were developed there to serve the city's growing population. In 1911, the site was expanded to become the privately owned Glen Echo Amusement Park, a popular facility that operated until 1968.

The National Park Service (NPS) now operates the park, which serves the Washington area as a regional cultural resource when offering classes, workshops and performances in the visual and performing arts. The park is known for its Streamline Moderne architecture, an antique Dentzel carousel and its historic Spanish Ballroom, as well as for its children's theater and social dance programs. Visitors also come to the park to participate in its festivals and events, which include the Washington Folk Festival and a Family Day.  

The NPS maintains a visitors center and conducts park history tours. More than 350,000 people attend events and participate in instructional activities at the park during each year.

History

Chautauqua
Edwin and Edward Baltzley, writers, inventors, industrialists, and real estate developers, hoped to build upon the banks of the Potomac River a suburban community free of the urban pollution of late-nineteenth century Washington. In order to compete with other suburban developments, the Baltzley twins planned a series of opulent attractions for their would-be community.
 
On February 24, 1891, the Baltzley twins incorporated the National Chautauqua of Glen Echo, the 53rd such assembly, and immediately set to building a stone citadel of culture to complement their real estate and resort enterprises. Opened on June 16, 1891, their arts and culture program included lectures and concerts in a 6,000-seat amphitheater; special classes in Bible studies, Greek, and Hebrew; physical training regimens; and university extension courses. Hundreds flocked to the site to picnic, attend lectures on American history by Jane Meade Welch, courses on ancient Egypt by Lysander Dickerman, and concerts by John Philip Sousa and his band. Clara Barton, encouraged by the Baltzleys, not only located her home and the American Red Cross headquarters at Glen Echo, but she presided over the Women's Executive Committee for the Chautauqua itself. The inaugural season's success warranted an extension well into August.

Failure
By the spring of 1892 the various Baltzley enterprises were gravely in debt. On April 7, 1892, the Glen Echo Sand and Building Company, a Baltzley subsidiary, borrowed a large sum of money giving the Chautauqua site as collateral. This was one of many Baltzley mortgages on the site. The financial difficulties spread to the Glen Echo Railroad Company, yet another Baltzley enterprise, which, because of the U.S. Army Corps of Engineers and the adjacent Washington Aqueduct system, had failed to bring the much anticipated street car service to the Chautauqua site and Glen Echo Village. 

Compounding their overextended credit, the Baltzley brothers found themselves the victim of common rumor. At the beginning of the 1892 season, rumor had spread throughout Washington that Glen Echo was rampant with malaria. Regardless of the validity of these accusations, when combined with the brother's precarious finances, the Chautauqua site fell into disuse.

Amusement park

In 1897, the Washington and Great Falls Electric Railway Company completed an electric streetcar line that traveled from a car barn in Georgetown, passed the former Chautauqua site and terminated in Cabin John. After changing its name to become the Washington Railway and Electric Company (WR&E) in 1902, the railroad constructed a trolley park (a type of amusement park) at the Chautauqua site. Named "Glen Echo Park", the facility became one of the larger establishments of its type in the Washington area. The park remained popular well into the late 1940s.  

Beginning in 1940, the Capital Transit Company (the successor to the WR&E) built a number of Streamline Moderne structures within its facility. By the mid-1950s, however, attendance began to decline due to the growing popularity of larger regional theme parks, such as Disneyland, and also because of the proliferation of new retail products that children of the baby boom generation could use during their leisure time. On January 3, 1960, the D.C. Transit System, Inc. (the successor to Capital Transit) closed the trolley line that had connected Georgetown to the park (see: Abandonment of streetcars in Washington, D.C.).

Segregation and integration at the amusement park
Like many public facilities in and around the Washington area, Glen Echo Park was restricted to whites for 63 out of the first 70 years of its history. On June 30, 1960, to draw attention to the park's racial segregation, a "D.C. Non-Violent Action Group", which students from the historically black Howard University led, organized an eleven-week civil rights campaign against the park's policies.

The campaign began with a sit-in protest on the carousel during which five African-American students were arrested for trespassing. Members of the liberal, politically connected and largely Jewish Bannockburn community near the park then joined the students in protesting and picketing for change. As a result, the park opened its doors to all races for the 1961 season. 

Four years later, the Supreme Court considered the student's arrests in Griffin v. Maryland. The court reversed the convictions on the grounds that the state of Maryland had unconstitutionally used its police power to help a private business enforce its racial exclusionary policy.

Amusement park closure
On Easter Monday, 1966, the park's roller coaster closed early after a cigarette thrown from a coaster car damaged its tracks. When park officials did not explain the reason for the closure, African Americans visiting from Washington became disruptive. As tensions flared, the park closed for the day, resulting in a mass exodus of approximately 6,000 customers.

Reports of slashed seats on the first bus returning to the city then prompted D.C. Transit to stop bus service to Glen Echo, stranding hundreds of people at the park. Vandalism occurred during long nighttime walks back to the city, adding to tensions in the communities surrounding the park.

Although the park's popularity had declined severely before this incident, newspaper coverage of the event further discouraged potential customers and dealt a blow from which the park could not recover. Attendance at the park fell when former patrons afraid of recurrences avoided the park. The park also developed a reputation of being a haven for teenage gangs.

In 1968, the U.S. Department of the Interior and the National Capital Planning Commission asked the General Services Administration (GSA) to try to acquire the Glen Echo Property by means of a swap, to include the land and all permanent structures. In April 1969, the park's owners announced that they would not open the park during that year. They sold most of the rides and other amusements during the next two years.

Acquisition and management by National Park Service
The GSA officially acquired the title to Glen Echo Park on April 1, 1970. Two months later, the NPS took over administration of the park. The Glen Echo tract and title was officially transferred to the NPS on March 5, 1976. Of the approximately  that originally came with the title, a portion became a part of the Clara Barton National Historic Site while the remainder ( became part of the lands of the George Washington Memorial Parkway. After a year of clean-up operations and planning, on June 20, 1971, the National Park Service opened the park to the public for the first of a series of consecutive summer Sunday afternoon events.

Dentzel carousel

The 1921 Dentzel menagerie carousel is the only park ride that remains from the former Glen Echo Amusement Park. The ride features 38 horses, four rabbits, four ostriches, a lion, a tiger, a giraffe, and a prancing deer. A Wurlitzer style 165 Band Organ provides the carousel's music; it was built in 1925 and replaced a Wurlitzer 153 band organ at the park in 1926. 

In its heyday the carousel sported an operating brass ring, in which riders could reach out and pull a ring out of a holder next to the carousel. Grabbing a brass ring would win the lucky rider a free ride. The brass ring arm is still visible today, although it no longer operates.

The face of the carousel had changed greatly since 1921, with the animals, rounding boards, inner drum panels, and band organ receiving several new coats of paint over the years. An installation photograph from 1921, as compared to the carousel in 1983, showed an original design of the body and tack on the Indian horse that was very different from the present-day animal. Chipping away at the horse's paint revealed several strata of differently colored and styled paint jobs spanning the past sixty years, with the original 1921 paint at the bottom.  

The carousel was restored by specialist Rosa Ragan, who has restored several other carousels in the United States. She restored the Indian horse by removing the park paint, exposing as much of the original paint as possible, and filling in the gaps in the original paint, a process called inpainting, before covering the horse in a protective varnish. This process, however, exposed the original paint to damage from riders, thus rendering the horse unrideable.

In order to restore each animal without risking damage to the original paint, Ragan developed a new process of uncovering the original paint job, recording the colors and design, and then covering the original paint with a reversible varnish before giving the animal a white base coat and repainting it in the original colors. However, Ragan did leave a small window of original paint exposed on each animal for riders to find.
These glimpses of the original 1921 paint are called "windows to the past" and can be found on the plain side (the inward-facing side) of each animal. Ragan's 20-year restoration of the carousel completely overhauled the animals, the band organ, and the rounding boards and drum panels, returning the carousel to its original beauty and splendor.

The carousel was in a scene in the 1989 comedy Chances Are starring Robert Downey Jr. and Cybill Shepherd. The carousel was individually listed on the National Register of Historic Places in 1980.

Arts and cultural center

Management by Glen Echo Park Partnership for Arts and Culture
Talks began of forming a formal partnership between the NPS and the government of Montgomery County, Maryland. A final management plan was proposed and accepted by February 2001. By establishing this formal partnership, enough funds became available to begin the necessary work on all the structures within the park. A non-profit partnership was formed, the Glen Echo Park Partnership for Arts and Culture, which would take over administration of the arts programming while the National Park Service would continue to oversee, manage, maintain, preserve, and protect the park's resources.

Each year, more than 350,000 people visit the park. The partnership's mission is to present artistic, cultural, and educational offerings at the park and to promote the park as a destination for the region's population. 

The partnership manages the park's arts programs and facilities, including its historic buildings. In collaboration with Montgomery County and the NPS, the partnership works with resident artists and organizations to develop arts programming, operates the Dentzel carousel and the Spanish Ballroom, presents a social dance program, produces festivals and special events, conducts fundraising and marketing, and manages and maintains all facilities.

From 2003 to 2010, extensive renovations of the park's facilities took place under the direction of the county and the NPS with input from the partnership and resident organizations. Federal, state, and county resources as well as private donations funded these renovations. The renovations included the Spanish Ballroom, the Dentzel Carousel, the Puppet Co. Playhouse, the Arcade building, the Yellow Barn, Adventure Theatre, the Candy Corner, the Chautauqua Tower, the Ballroom Annex, and the Caretaker's Cottage.

Resident arts programs
Glen Echo Park is home to thirteen resident artists and arts organizations. The resident artists and organizations offer classes, concerts, exhibitions, open studios hours, workshops, and lectures. Resident programs and artists include: Adventure Theatre MTC, Art Glass Center at Glen Echo, Glen Echo Glassworks, Glen Echo Pottery, J. Jordan Bruns, Photoworks, Playgroup in the Park, the Puppet Co., SilverWorks, Glen Echo Park Aquarium, Washington Conservatory of Music, Yellow Barn Studio & Gallery, and Young Creative Spirit.

Special events and concerts

The park hosts several family festivals and special events throughout the year, including Family Day (when the carousel opens for the season), Then & Wow, Labor Day Art Show, Irish Music and Dance Showcase, Washington Folk Festival, Fall Frolic, Contrastock, an extensively-decorated Halloween dance, inaugural balls, and Winter's Eve.  From June through August, the Glen Echo Park Partnership presents a free summer concert series each Thursday night in the Bumper Car Pavilion.

Social dancing

Glen Echo Park offers a broad array of social dance events and classes as part of its standard programs. There are regular dances and classes in waltz, swing, contra, and salsa. Dances take place in the historic Spanish Ballroom, the Bumper Car Pavilion, and the recently renovated, climate-controlled Ballroom Annex (The Back Room). 

Approximately 60,000 people attend Glen Echo Park's dances each year. A $19 million renovation of the Spanish Ballroom in 2003 returned it to its original splendor, giving it continued prominence as one of the premiere sites for dancing in the Washington DC area.  

The 18-month renovation was preceded by a National Park Service led, volunteer-labor makeover of the deteriorating Bumper Car Pavilion, converting it into an all-weather dance pavilion & band shell, for uninterrupted dancing through the renovation. Currently, it remains in use as an alternative dance venue and for private events, such as wedding receptions.

All social dances are open to the public, for all ages, with no prior experience or partner required. All dances offer an introductory lesson before the dance begins and most include live music. Alcohol is prohibited on park grounds, and smoking is prohibited in all buildings.

PCC streetcar
In 2005, the Southeastern Pennsylvania Transport Authority (SEPTA) donated to the NPS a streamlined 1947 PCC streetcar that had earlier served Philadelphia. The NPS installed the historic trolley on tracks laid in front of the entrance to Glen Echo Park, with plans to restore it at a cost of about $100,000. However, the streetcar deteriorated when no funds became available for the restoration. The streetcar left Glen Echo in 2012 after the GSA sold it, but its tracks remained in place.

Incidents at Glen Echo Park
 June 23, 1918: The first fatality at the amusement park occurred when Joseph J. Hamel, a 43 year old stone cutter from Washington, fell from a roller-coaster (known as Gravity Railway) car while sitting on an armrest, due to overcrowding. Hamel was rushed to Georgetown Hospital but died the next day.

 May 5, 1989, during a Friday night contra dance, the rain-swollen Minnehaha Creek overflowed its banks, and an estimated 25 vehicles were swept from the main parking lot toward the Potomac River, some of them actually ending up in the river. More than 50 vehicles were destroyed.

Images 
Pictures of Glen Echo Park are available on Wikimedia Commons.

See also
Chautauqua Tower

Footnotes

References

External links

Glen Echo Park, from the National Park Service
Glen Echo Park: Center for Education and Recreation, a National Park Service Teaching with Historic Places (TwHP) lesson plan
 Cook, Richard A. (1997). A History of Glen Echo, Maryland.
Glen Echo Town
Glen Echo Park 
, including 2003 photo — Maryland Historical Trust 
, including 2003 photo — Maryland Historical Trust
Guide to the Glen Echo Chautauqua and Glen Echo Park Company records, 1889-1953 — George Washington University

The following are filed under 7300 MacArthur Boulevard, Glen Echo, Montgomery County, MD:

Historic districts on the National Register of Historic Places in Maryland
Queen Anne architecture in Maryland
Amusement parks in Maryland
Shingle Style architecture in Maryland
Tourist attractions in Montgomery County, Maryland
Defunct amusement parks in the United States
National Park Service areas in Maryland
Buildings and structures in Montgomery County, Maryland
Arts centers in Maryland
Parks in Montgomery County, Maryland
Historic American Buildings Survey in Maryland
Historic American Engineering Record in Maryland
Historic American Landscapes Survey in Maryland
National Register of Historic Places in Montgomery County, Maryland
Event venues on the National Register of Historic Places in Maryland
Spanish Colonial Revival architecture in the United States